Birkenhead is a town in Wirral, Merseyside, England.  Its central area contains 150 buildings that are recorded in the National Heritage List for England as designated listed buildings.  Of these, six are listed at  Grade I, the highest of the three grades, six at Grade II*, the middle grade, and the others are at Grade II, the lowest grade. This list contains the listed buildings in the central area of the town, and the other listed buildings are to be found in separate lists.

Birkenhead did not develop as a town until the 19th century. Before that, a Benedictine priory was established in the 1170s, and the monks ran a ferry across the River Mersey. By 1811, the priory was in ruins, but a ferry was still in existence, carrying passengers to the growing port of Liverpool. The lord of the manor, with the intention of creating a bathing resort, built a few streets and commissioned the building of St Mary's Church next to the priory site. However, Birkenhead developed as an industrial town rather than a resort starting from 1823 when William Laird built a boiler factory. This grew into a shipbuilding yard, and Laird commissioned James Gillespie Graham to design residential accommodation. A rectangular street plan was envisaged, with Hamilton Square, which was built from about 1825, as the centrepiece.

In 1843 it was decided to build a park in the town; this is Birkenhead Park, the first park in the world to be financed from public funds. The park was designed by Joseph Paxton and the building was supervised by Edward Kemp. Entrances, gateways, lodges, and other structures were designed for the park by Lewis Hornblower and John Robertson.  Meanwhile, high-class residential accommodation was being built both around the park and in other areas, such as Clifton Park, the layout and buildings designed by Walter Scott and Charles Reed.  At the same time, the shipbuilding industry was developing, and more docks were being built, initially by J .M. Rendell, and later by J.B. Hartley.  During the 20th century, two road tunnels were built under the River Mersey, the first being the Queensway Tunnel, built in 1925–34 between Birkenhead and Liverpool, and designed by Basil Mott and John Brodie, with Herbert J. Rowse as engineer. This has impressive entrances and ventilation stations.

The listed buildings reflect the history of the town, the oldest being the ruins of the priory and its renovated chapter house. The next listed buildings date from the 19th century, and include houses, shops, churches, public houses, buildings associated with the park, buildings associated with Flaybrick Hill Cemetery, docks and associated structures, and street furniture. Later in the century and in the early 20th century, public buildings were built, together with a railway station, statues and memorials, a Quaker meeting house and, later in the 20th century, structures associated with the Queensway Tunnel.

Key

Buildings

See also

Listed buildings in Bidston
Listed buildings in Claughton, Merseyside
Listed buildings in Noctorum
Listed buildings in Oxton, Merseyside
Listed buildings in Prenton
Listed buildings in Rock Ferry
Listed buildings in Tranmere, Merseyside
Listed buildings in Woodchurch, Merseyside

References
Citations

Sources

 

Listed buildings in Merseyside
Lists of listed buildings in Merseyside